In Islamic tradition, Darda'il (Arabic: دردائيل "Journeyers of God") are angels that travel in the earth searching out assemblies where people remember God's name. An angel named Darda'il is also invoked in exorcism.

The angel is also present in Yazidism.

See also
 List of angels in theology

References

Classes of angels
Angels in Islam